Cindy Figg-Currier (born February 23, 1960) is an American professional golfer who joined the LPGA Tour in October 1984. She was instructed by Paul Marchand and Harvey Penick. She also played under her maiden name, Cindy Figg, before her marriage on July 19, 1986.

Figg was born in Mount Pleasant, Michigan. She started playing golf at age seven. She was the 1976 Toledo, Ohio junior girls golf champion and the 1978 Michigan Prep golf champion while she was at Mount Pleasant High School. In 2003, she was inducted into the Michigan Golf Hall of Fame.

Figg played college golf at the University of Texas where she was named Most Valuable Player as a senior. She led UT to three top-10 Association for Intercollegiate Athletics for Women (AIAW) national tournament finishes. She individually won the 1982 Women's Trans-National. She graduated in 1982 with a business-marketing degree.

Figg-Currier won once on the LPGA Tour in 1997. She also has 31 top-10s on the LPGA Tour. She has also won three times on the Legends Tour and played in the Legends Tour Handa Cup in 2008. Her career earnings exceed two million dollars.

Figg-Currier is currently a board member for The First Tee of Greater Austin.

Professional wins (5)

LPGA Tour wins (1)

LPGA Tour playoff record (1–0)

Legends Tour (3)
2008 BJ's Charity Championship (with Sherri Turner), Wendy's Charity Challenge
2010 Wendy's Charity Classic

Other wins (1)
2010 Texas Women's Open

Team appearances
Professional
Handa Cup (representing the United States): 2008 (winners), 2012 (tie, Cup retained), 2013

References

External links

American female golfers
Texas Longhorns women's golfers
LPGA Tour golfers
Golfers from Michigan
Golfers from Austin, Texas
People from Mount Pleasant, Michigan
People from Lakeway, Texas
1960 births
Living people